The 1875 Rangitikei by-election was a by-election held on 24 April 1875 during the 5th New Zealand Parliament in the Rangitikei electorate on the West Coast of the North Island.

The by-election was held because of the resignation of sitting member of parliament and previous Premier William Fox on 11 March 1875 
in order to pay an extended visit to England.

This election saw John Ballance narrowly win the seat by just seven votes over his main opponent, William Hogg Watt who had represented the Rangitikei electorate from 1866 to 1868 when he resigned. Conservative George Hutchison also ran. He was the son of William Hutchison a former mayor of Wellington and Member of Parliament, though performed poorly.

Results
The following table gives the election results:

See also
Rangitikei by-election (disambiguation), other by-elections for the Rangitikei electorate

Notes

References

Rangitikei 1875
1875 elections in New Zealand
Politics of Rangitikei